Aslan v Murphy and Duke v Wynn [1989] EWCA Civ 2 is an English land law case deciding whether an occupier was a tenant or, instead, a lodger.

The case confirmed the anti-avoidance principles which apply to interpreting whether a habitation arrangement is a lease or a licence (to occupy).  A  hours-per-day "licence" was held to be a lease; with exclusive possession of room, with a lock. The judgment expressed an intention-based test where the live-in landlord acts as the keyholder, giving examples as to where exclusive possession is not being denied as part of the living arrangements by the landlord retaining the keys.

Facts
An agreement provided the “licensee” could use the room only between midnight and 10.30am and noon and midnight.

Judgment
Lord Donaldson MR held that this provision was a pretence and not part of the “true bargain”.

Cases cited

Followed
Street v Mountford [1985] UKHL 4

See also

English land law
English trusts law
English property law

References

English land case law
Court of Appeal (England and Wales) cases
1989 in case law
1989 in British law